The Dominica Labour Party is a centre-left social-democratic political party in Dominica.

History 
Founded in 1955 by Phyllis Shand Allfrey and Emmanuel Christopher Loblack, the Dominica Labour Party is the oldest political party in Dominica. It first contested general elections in 1961, winning seven of the eleven seats. In the next elections in 1966 it won all but one of the seats. It retained power in the 1970 elections, although it was reduced to eight seats. A fourth consecutive victory was achieved in the 1975 elections when it won 16 of the 21 seats.

In 1980 the party suffered a major defeat, seeing its vote share reduced from 50% to 17%, and losing all its seats as the Dominica Freedom Party won the elections. It regained five seats in the 1985 elections, losing one in 1990 and gaining one in 1995.

In the 2000 elections, the party regained power for the first time since 1975, winning 10 of the 21 seats and forming a coalition with the DFP, after which Roosevelt "Rosie" Douglas became Prime Minister. However, on 1 October, 2000 Douglas died suddenly after only a few months in office and was replaced by Pierre Charles. On 6 January, 2004, Charles, who had been suffering from heart problems since 2003, also died. After the death of Pierre Charles, Foreign Minister Osborne Riviere acted as Prime Minister, until Education Minister Roosevelt Skerrit was named political leader of the party and sworn in as Prime Minister.

Under the leadership of Roosevelt Skerrit, the party won 12 seats in the 2005 elections and remained in office. In the 2009 general elections the Dominica Labour Party scored a third consecutive victory winning 18 of the 21 seats, despite the opposition's claims of campaign improprieties.

Electoral history

House of Assembly elections

References

External links 
 Official party website
 Political Parties of the Americas, 1980s to 1990s

Labour parties
Former member parties of the Socialist International
Political parties in Dominica
Political parties established in 1957